Jewel Robbery is a 1932 American pre-Code romantic comedy heist film, directed by William Dieterle and starring William Powell and Kay Francis. It is based on the 1931 Hungarian play Ékszerrablás a Váci-utcában by Ladislas Fodor and its subsequent English adaptation, Jewel Robbery by Bertram Bloch.

Plot
Viennese Baroness Teri von Horhenfels (Kay Francis) relieves the boredom of her marriage to her rich but dull older husband (Henry Kolker) with love affairs. One day, she meets both her husband and a current lover, Paul (Hardie Albright), at an exclusive jewel shop, where the Baron is to buy her an extravagant  diamond ring.  While he and the shop owner retire to haggle over price, her tedium is lifted by the arrival of a suave jewel thief (William Powell) and his gang. In turn, he is entranced by her beauty and uninhibited, even cheeky, personality. He locks her husband and Paul, a young cabinet minister she has already tired of, in the vault, and forces shop owner Hollander (Lee Kohlmar) to smoke a marijuana-laced cigarette that soon makes him forget his troubles. However, she persuades Powell to leave her free, but not before he takes her ring.

After misdirecting the police, Teri returns home, envied of her adventure by her equally bored but less reckless friend Marianne (Helen Vinson). A vase of flowers appears in the house but the housekeeper says no delivery was made. Teri surmises that the jewel thief has visited. She and Marianne go upstairs to discover her safe has been cracked. Initially outraged, they discover that nothing has been taken and Teri's ring has been returned. Marianne departs hastily, anxious to avoid becoming entangled in a potential scandal. The thief then enters through the window, and informs Teri that the diamonds taken from the jewel shop are hidden in the safe. He explains it is the safest place to hide them, but a flustered Teri tries to make him take the ring, since she would be considered an accomplice if it was returned to her. When he refuses to take it back, she accuses him of using her to hide out from the police. Police detective Fritz (Alan Mowbray) arrives, flushes out the robber, and takes the two into custody.

However, the arrest is staged; Fritz is a member of the gang. The thief had used the fake arrest to transport Teri to his house without protest for a night of romance. She is intrigued. Instead of plunging into love-making she insists on being wooed.  He shows her safe upon safe of jewels from previous heists.  Aware Vienna has become too hot for him, he asks her to meet him in Nice, but she hesitates. Just then, the real police arrive and storm the place. He ties Teri up to divert suspicion then flees. Pretending to be terrified, she calls for help. After being untied, and giving a false description of the thief, she announces that she needs a vacation to recover from all the excitement, and will take the first train to Nice. She winks at the camera.

Cast
 William Powell as The Robber
 Kay Francis as Baroness Teri
 Helen Vinson as Marianne
 Hardie Albright as Paul
 Alan Mowbray as Detective Fritz
 Andre Luguet as Count Andre
 Henry Kolker as Baron Franz
 Spencer Charters as Lenz
 Lee Kohlmar as Hollander
 Clarence Wilson as Prefect of Police

Production
The pairing of William Powell and Kay Francis was the fifth of their seven films.  Powell, who had recently married Carole Lombard, did not want to do the film initially, but gave in because he saw the role as an amusing one.

Response
The New York Times gave the film a lukewarm review, calling it a "nervous, brittle comedy", placing the blame on Kay Francis ("her performance is one in which her usual intelligence and sincerity are strangely absent").

See also
 The Peterville Diamond (1942)

References

External links
 
 
 

1932 films
1932 romantic comedy films
American black-and-white films
American films based on plays
American crime comedy films
American romantic comedy films
Films directed by William Dieterle
Films set in Vienna
Warner Bros. films
1930s English-language films
1930s American films
Films scored by Bernhard Kaun
Adultery in films
Films about nobility